John Snorri Sigurjónsson (20 June 1973 –  5 February 2021) was an Icelandic high-altitude mountaineer. In May 2017, he became the first Icelander to summit Lhotse in the Himalayas, which is 8,516 meters high and the fourth highest mountain in the world. On July 28 of the same year, he became the first Icelander to summit K2. On 4 August 2017, he successfully summited Broad Peak (8051 m).

On 5 February 2021, John Snorri along with Ali Sadpara and Juan Pablo Mohr went missing while attempting a K2 summit push from Camp 3. On 18 February, Pakistan authorities officially presumed the three men dead, but stated that the search for their remains would continue. On 26 July 2021, the bodies of the three missing mountaineers were found in the slopes above Camp 4.

Early life 
Born in the countryside of Ölfus, Iceland, he excelled at sports at an early age, and later found his physical and mental passion in mountain climbing.

Disappearance
In November 2020, John Snorri, along with Ali Sadpara and Sajid Sadpara had organized an attempt to summit K2 during the winter time. 
On January 18, Russian-American climber Alex Goldfarb went missing during a training climb on nearby Pastore Peak. John delayed his plans to help with search and rescue operation, although the operation was not successful. 

After arriving at K2, Chilean mountaineer Juan Pablo Mohr Prieto joined the group and on 4 February 2021, the group started their final summit push. Sajid had to descend to Camp 3 due to a technical issue with his oxygen device, leaving the others at the Bottleneck, close to the summit. His father, Snorri, and Mohr continued the ascent, but they did not return by night as planned.

Pakistan authorities declared on 18 February that the three men were officially presumed dead, but that the search for their remains would continue. At the end of June 2021, filmmaker Elia Saikaly, along with Sajid Sadpara and PK Sherpa, started a search on the mountain for the missing climbers. On 26 July 2021, the bodies of the three missing mountaineers were found in the slopes above Camp 4 by a Madison Mountaineering Sherpa Team fixing ropes above Camp 4.

Personal life 
John Snorri was married to Lína Móey Bjarnadóttir. He has six children.

Mountaineering experience 
His first notable success was Mont Blanc (4,808 meters) in 2011, the highest mountain in the Alps. In the following years he conquered some of the world's most challenging summits.

 Ama Dablam (6,812 meters) in 2015
 Mount Elbrus (5,642 meters) in 2016
 Lhotse (8,516 meters) in 2017 (first Icelander to summit)
 K2 (8,611 meters) in 2017 (first Icelander to summit)
 Broad Peak (8,047 meters) in 2017
 Matterhorn (4,478 meters) in 2018
 Breithorn (4,164 meters) in 2018
 Pollux (4,092 meters) in 2018
 Manaslu (8,156 meters) in 2019

See also
List of solved missing person cases
List of unsolved deaths

References

1973 births
2020s missing person cases
2021 deaths
Formerly missing people
John Snorri Sigurjonsson
Missing person cases in Pakistan
Mountaineering deaths on K2
Unsolved deaths